Never Felt So Good is the second full-length album by R&B singer-songwriter James Ingram, released in 1986. It reached number 123 on the US charts, and peaked at number 37 on the R&B charts. It reached number 72 in Britain.

Critical reception
The Los Angeles Times wrote that the album "is dominated by inferior upbeat material and undermined by punchless production. The few ballads should be the high points but they're woefully schmaltzy."

Track listing
All songs written by James Ingram and Keith Diamond, except where noted.
"Always" - 4:17
"Never Felt So Good" (Diamond, Ingram, Howard Hewett) - 4:03
"Red Hot Lover" - 3:50
"Lately" - 4:15
"Wings of My Heart" - 3:12
"Trust Me" - 4:17
"Tuff" - 1:03
"Say Hey" (Ingram, Bernard Taylor) - 4:02
"Love's Been Here and Gone" (Ingram, Leon Ware, Cynthia Weil) - 6:00
"Right Back" (Ingram, Leon Ware) - 3:58
"Crazy" - 3:40

Personnel 
 James Ingram – lead vocals (all tracks), arrangements (all tracks), backing vocals (1-4, 6, 7, 8, 10), keyboards (4, 7, 8, 10), bass (4, 6, 8), synthesizers (8), drums (8), synth bass (10)
 Keith Diamond – keyboards (1, 3, 5-8), Fairlight CMI (1, 2, 4), bass (1-4, 7), drums (1-4, 6, 7), arrangements (1-7), synth solo (2, 4), percussion (2), backing vocals (2, 7), Simmons drums (3), strings (5), rap (7)
 Ned Liben – Fairlight CMI (1, 2, 4)
 Bernard Taylor – keyboards (8), drums (8), backing vocals (8), arrangements (8)
 Randy Waldman – keyboards (9, 10), synth solo (9, 10)
 Leon Ware – arrangements (9, 10), keyboards (10), backing vocals (10)
 Clarence Brice – guitar (1, 6)
 Paul Pesco – guitar (2, 3, 4, 7)
 Paul Jackson Jr. – guitar (10)
 Timmy Allen – bass (2)
 Nathan East – bass (9)
 Bob Rosa – drums (3), cymbal (5)
 Ricky Lawson – drums (9)
 John Robinson – drums (10)
 Paulinho da Costa – percussion (8), wind chimes (9)
 Richard Marrero – percussion (10)
 Leon Pendarvis – horn arrangements (2, 4), string arrangements (2, 4), conductor (2, 4)
 Debbie McDuffie – horn and string contractor (2, 4)
 Jeremy Lubbock – arrangements (9), string arrangements and conductor (9)
 Jules Chakin – string contractor (9)
 Lawrence Feldman – saxophone (2, 4)
 Alex Foster – saxophone (2, 4)
 Lenny Pickett – saxophone (2, 4)
 Jeff Smith – saxophone (6)
 Jerome Richardson – flute solo (8), soprano saxophone (9)
 Dave Bargeron – trombone (2, 4)
 Tom Malone – trombone (2, 4)
 Earl Gardner – trumpet (2, 4)
 Joe Shepley – trumpet (2, 4)
 Rahmlee Michael Davis – trumpet (8)
 Harry Kim – trumpet (8)
 Strings (2, 4) – Jonathan Abramowitz, Sanford Allen, Julien Barber, Alfred Brown, Harold Coletta, Peter Dimitriades, Theodore Israel, Harold Kohan, Isadora Kohan, Jesse Levy, Louann Montesi, Kermit Moore, Gene Orloff, Noel Pointer and Marylin Wright.
 Strings (9) – Marylin Baker, Mari Botnick, Denyse Buffman, Thomas Buffman, Ronald Cooper, Assa Drori, Ernie Ehrhardt, Henry Ferber, Edward Green III, Allan Harshman, Reg Hill, Paula Hochholter, Bill Hybel, Susie Katayama, Gordon Marron, Don Palmer, Sheldon Sanov, David Schwartz, Frederick Seykora, Marshall Sosson, David Speltz, Robert Sushel, Gerard Vinci and Shari Zippert.
 Vocal Contractors – Laura Chan, Vicki Genfan, Curtis King and Gigi Weatherspoon.
 El DeBarge – backing vocals (1) 
 Howard Hewett – backing vocals (1, 10) 
 David Pack – backing vocals (1) 
 Dennis Collins – backing vocals (2)
 Lillo Thomas – backing vocals (2)
 Tawatha Agee – backing vocals (3)
 Michael Bolton – backing vocals (3)
 Sandy Farina – backing vocals (3)
 Curtis King – backing vocals (3)
 Marilyn Redfield – backing vocals (3)
 April Lang – additional vocals (4)
 Toni Smith – additional vocals (4)
 Cindy Mizelle – backing vocals (6)
 Renee Diggs – additional vocals (6)
 Michelle Gold – backing vocals (7), rap (7)
 James Smith – backing vocals (7)
 Lynn Davis – backing vocals (9)
 Maxi Anderson – backing vocals (10)
 Phillip Ingram – backing vocals (10)
 Phil Perry – backing vocals (10)

Production 
 Producers – Keith Diamond (Tracks 1-7); James Ingram (Tracks 8, 9 & 10). 
 Executive Producer – Quincy Jones
 Recording and Mixing – Keith Diamond (Tracks 1-7); Bob Rosa (Tracks 1-8); Tommy Vicari (Tracks 8, 9 & 10); James Ingram (Tracks 9 & 10). 
 Additional Engineers – J. C. Convertino, Ken Fink, Matt Forger and Acar Key.
 Assistant Engineers – Ed Bruder, Acar Key, Fernando Kral, Laura Livingston, Ralph Sutton, Mike Webber and Jeffrey Woodruff.
 Mastered by Bernie Grundman at Bernie Grundman Mastering (Hollywood, CA).
 Art Direction – Jeri McManus
 Design – Kim Champange and Jeri McManus
 Photography – Matthew Rolston
 Stylist – Raymond Lee
 Liner Notes – Keith Diamond, James Ingram and Quincy Jones.

Charts

References

1986 albums
James Ingram albums
Qwest Records albums
Warner Records albums